The 2003 Rallye Deutschland (formally the 22nd ADAC Rallye Deutschland) was the eight round of the 2003 World Rally Championship. The race was held over three days between 25 July and 27 July 2003, and was based in Trier, Germany. Citroen's Sébastien Loeb won the race, his 3rd win in the World Rally Championship.

Background

Entry list

Itinerary
All dates and times are CEST (UTC+2).

Results

Overall

World Rally Cars

Classification

Special stages

Championship standings

Production World Rally Championship

Classification

Special stages

Championship standings

References

External links 
 Official website of the World Rally Championship

Deutschland
Rallye Deutschland
Rallye